Events from the year 1366 in Ireland.

Incumbent
Lord: Edward III

Events

Irish Parliament at Kilkenny before Prince Lionel of Clarence, Earl of Ulster codifies the legislation of the previous 50 years in the Statutes of Kilkenny, prohibiting, among other things, the adoption of the Irish language by the colonists.

Births

Deaths

References

 
1366
1360s in Ireland
Ireland